Ihor Zaytsev (born 11 May 1989) is a Ukrainian basketball player for the Taipei Fubon Braves of the P. League+.

Professional career
After having started the 2016–17 season with the Polish team Stelmet Zielona Góra, on 9 December , 2016, Zaytsev signed with the Spanish team Manresa. On February 6, 2017, he parted ways with Manresa after appearing in seven games. Four days later, he returned to his former club Rosa Radom.

References

1989 births
Living people
Basket Zielona Góra players
Bàsquet Manresa players
BC Azovmash players
BC Khimik players
Liga ACB players
Petrochimi Bandar Imam BC players
Power forwards (basketball)
Rosa Radom players
Sportspeople from Dnipro
Ukrainian expatriate basketball people in Iran
Ukrainian expatriate basketball people in Poland
Ukrainian expatriate basketball people in Spain
Ukrainian men's basketball players
2014 FIBA Basketball World Cup players
Expatriate basketball people in Taiwan
Taipei Fubon Braves players
Taiwan Beer basketball players
Super Basketball League imports
P. League+ imports